Telefônica Brasil, trading as Vivo, is a Brazilian telecommunications group, subsidiary of Spanish Telefónica.

It was originally formed as part of Telebrás, the state-owned telecom monopoly at the time. In 1998, Telebrás was demerged and privatized. Telefónica bought Telesp, the São Paulo division, and rebranded it to Telefónica. The group has a participation of 15% in its revenues in the world and currently the company has more than 90 million customers.

In 2010, Telefónica acquired the shares of Vivo that belonged to Portugal Telecom, and transferred control of the company to Telefônica-Vivo, its subsidiary in Brazil. In 2012 the company's services began to be marketed under the Vivo brand, its services, such as internet access, cable and satellite television, fixed and mobile telecommunications, among others, were integrated in this brand, launched in 2003 for the Telefónica-Portugal Telecom mobile telecommunications joint venture.

References

External links
 Official website
 Vivo Website
 Vivo Internet
 Vivo Empresas
 Plano Vivo Empresas

See also
 List of telecommunications companies in Brazil
 List of internet service providers in Brazil

Telefónica
Companies based in São Paulo
Companies listed on the New York Stock Exchange
Telecommunications companies of Brazil
Internet service providers of Brazil
Companies listed on B3 (stock exchange)
Telecommunications companies established in 1998
Brazilian subsidiaries of foreign companies